"Help Me Girl" is a song performed by Eric Burdon in 1966. It was billed to Eric Burdon for his 1967 solo album, Eric Is Here which also featured drummer Barry Jenkins, the only group member to remain during the transition from the "first" Animals group to the "new" lineup.

Chart performance
"Help Me Girl" reached number 29 on the U.S. charts and number 14 on the UK charts.

Cover versions
At the same time, of The Animals US release, The Outsiders released it as a single reaching number 37 on the U.S. charts.
"Help Me Girl" was covered a few times  and was the only single of Burdon's solo album.

References

1966 songs
1966 singles
Songs written by Scott English
Songs written by Larry Weiss
Eric Burdon songs
The Animals songs
Song recordings produced by Tom Wilson (record producer)
MGM Records singles